For the radio program of the same name, see Curtain Time (radio program).

Curtain Time is an album by pop vocalist Jack Jones.

Track listing
"People Will Say We're in Love" (Richard Rodgers, Oscar Hammerstein II) (1:49)
"I See Your Face Before Me" (Arthur Schwartz, Howard Dietz) (3:14)
"Luck Be a Lady" (Frank Loesser) (2:29)
"Embraceable You" (George Gershwin, Ira Gershwin) (3:32)
"I Love Paris" (Cole Porter) (2:11)
"I've Grown Accustomed to Her Face" (Frederick Loewe, Alan Jay Lerner) (3:29)
"People" (Jule Styne, Bob Merrill) (2:22)
"Shall We Dance?" (Richard Rodgers, Oscar Hammerstein II) (2:02)
"It Never Entered My Mind" (Richard Rodgers, Lorenz Hart) (2:32)
"A Lot of Livin' to Do" (Charles Strouse, Lee Adams) (2:31) 
"Ev'ry Time We Say Goodbye" (Cole Porter) (2:55)

1966 albums
Jack Jones (singer) albums
Kapp Records albums